Hadath (or Hadeth) was a diocese of the Syriac Orthodox Church in the Malatya region of what is now Turkey, attested between the eighth and eleventh centuries. It was based in the town of Hadath.

Location 
Hadath was a small town near Melitene (modern Malatya), now in ruins, close to the village of Saray Koy in the vilayet of Gaziantep, in Turkey.  According to the Chronicle of Michael the Syrian, the town was founded in AG 1095 [AD 783/4], towards the end of the reign of the Abbasid caliph al-Mahdi (774–85), by ʿAli ibn Sulaiman, the son of the Arab governor of Mesopotamia.  It was evidently given a Jacobite bishop very shortly after its foundation.

Bishops of Hadath 
The main source for the bishops of Hadath is the record of episcopal consecrations appended to Volume III of the Chronicle of Syriac Orthodox Patriarch Michael the Syrian  (1166–99).  In this Appendix Michael lists nearly all of the bishops consecrated by the Jacobite Patriarchs between the ninth and twelfth centuries. Twenty-eight Patriarchs sat during this period, and in most cases Michael was able to list the names of the bishops consecrated during their reigns, their monasteries of origin, and the place where they were consecrated. In these lists, Michael mentions fourteen Bishops of Hadath serving between the eighth and eleventh centuries.

Further details of some of these bishops are supplied in the narrative sections of the Chronicle of Michael the Syrian and in the Chronicon Ecclesiasticum of Bar Hebraeus:

Iwanis (1004/1030) was taken to Constantinople in 1029 with the patriarch Yohannan VII bar ʿAbdon  on the orders of the Byzantine emperor Romanus III Argyrus,  and was imprisoned in an attempt to force him to make a Chalcedonian confession of faith.  He died in prison.

Notes

References 
 
 
 Jean-Baptiste Chabot, Chronique de Michel le Syrien, Patriarche Jacobite d'Antiche (1166-1199). Éditée pour la première fois et traduite en francais I-IV (1899;1901;1905;1910; a supplement to volume I containing an introduction to Michael and his work, corrections, and an index, was published in 1924. Reprinted in four volumes 1963, 2010).

Syriac Orthodox dioceses
Oriental Orthodoxy in Turkey